Chrome Hearts is a luxury brand from Hollywood, founded in 1988 by Richard Stark, Leonard Kamhout and John Bowman. It is currently co-owned by Richard Stark and his wife Laurie Lynn Stark. Its logo contains a cross with the brand name around it on a circular ribbon. The brand produces silver, gold, and diamond accessories, alongside eyewear, leather, clothing and furniture. The production site covers three blocks in the middle of Hollywood and consists of multiple buildings and factories around the world. Production is mainly done in-house at the big production site in Hollywood.  As of 2021, they have 1000 staff at their Los Angeles production site. Although not officially disclosed by Chrome Hearts, the brand is estimated to be worth around $1 billion.

History
Richard Stark and John Bowman started the business in a Los Angeles garage in early 1988. Bowman was a manufacturer of leather goods, while Stark merchandised top grade raw leathers. They initially established the label in order to produce leather jackets that weren't available on the market. The third partner was master sterling silver jeweller Leonard Kamhout. The company's first task was a costume design for Chopper Chicks in Zombietown, co-starring the girlfriend of Steve Jones, the lead guitarist of the Sex Pistols; Stark took the name of the brand from the working title of the movie. In 1992, the brand was awarded Accessory Designer Award of the Year by the CFDA. In 1994, Stark, Bowman, and Kamhout had a falling-out, and Bowman and Kamhout withdrew from the brand. Since 1994, Chrome Hearts has been co-owned by Richard Stark and his wife Laurie Lynn Stark.
Official Website

In 1996, the first Chrome Hearts boutique opened at 159 East, 64th Street, Manhattan, New York City. In 1999, a second boutique opened in Minami-Aoyama, Tokyo. In 2000, Richard Stark collaborated with Tommy Perse, owner of Maxfield, and architect Mark Steele to build a third boutique in West Hollywood, Los Angeles. In 2003, Chrome Hearts opened a boutique at Prince's Building, Hong Kong.

In the early 2000s, Chrome Hearts began publishing its own fashion magazine, which featured interviews and celebrity photoshoots, many of which were shot by Laurie Lynn Stark. It was published until 2017.

In April 2020, Chrome Hearts sued clothing brand MNML for using their trademark cross symbol on jeans.

Goods and products 
Chrome Hearts is primarily recognized for its clothing, accessories, furniture, leather products, and eyewear. The majority of their products are produced in their Hollywood production factory.

In 2016, they introduced their first fragrance collection. It was based on two scents, featuring products such as incense and Eau de Parfum.

Collaborations
In 2002, Chrome Hearts introduced a collaboration with The Rolling Stones featuring the band's iconic "Lips and Tongue" motif.

In 2007, Japanese fashion brand Comme des Garçons collaborated with Chrome Hearts on a series of pendants and garments. Prior to this, in the 90s, Rei Kawakubo from Comme des Garçons had already worked with the brand by displaying their products in the Aoyama flagship store.

In 2009, fashion brand BAPE (A Bathing Ape) collaborated with them on a series of t-shirts including the 12-piece limited edition Chrome Hearts X BABY MILO.

In 2010, they partnered on shoe design with the Robert Mapplethorpe Foundation, and Rick Owens. The shoes are adorned with various silver embellishments. In 2010, they collaborated with Owens on jewelry and sneakers which were unveiled at Paris Fashion week. 
 
In March 2014, Chrome Hearts bought a minority stake in high-end knitwear brand The Elder Statesman. The firm employed its hallmark silver accents in a customization of the iconic Adidas Stan Smith in early 2016.

In November 2014, Chrome Hearts opened their Miami boutique, with a Fahey/Klein Gallery on the second floor that showcased photographs from the 20th-century by various photographers. Additionally, the boutique displayed artworks by Los Angeles artist Matt DiGiacomo and photographs from the Robert Mapplethorpe Estate. A store for the luxury fashion brand The Elder Statesman and another branch of David's Cafe, a Cuban café in Miami, was also built within the boutique.

In December 2015, Ladurée worked with Chrome Hearts and opened a macaron and tea café on the ground floor of Chrome Hearts' Miami store. The café also sold a collectible macaron box. On the second floor, they collaborated with Sean Kelly Gallery to display artworks by artists such as Mariko Mori.

Chrome Hearts has had multiple collaborations with Virgil Abloh from Off-White. In 2015 and 2016, they collaborated on capsule collections, with the latter primarily consisting of t-shirts. In 2018, they released a hoodie and another collection. In 2019, Abloh, alongside Louis Vuitton, hosted a fashion show at their New York branch.

Bella Hadid used to visit the factory in LA as a teenager and collaborated with the brand on a 40-piece apparel and accessories collection released in 2017. The CHROME HEARTS x BELLA collection debuted at Paris Fashion Week, and is sold exclusively at Selfridges. Bella's sister Gigi Hadid has modeled for the brand. Chrome Hearts has had a few collaborations with Bella Hadid since then, including the release of an eyewear collection and also tie-dye t-shirts, for a Feeding America fundraiser during the COVID-19 pandemic. These 49 t-shirts were hand-dyed by Bella Hadid, released in three different styles and sold for $260 each with all of the proceeds given to the fundraiser.

In 2020, Drake collaborated with Chrome Hearts for his Rolls-Royce Cullinan, which included a customized hood ornament, air conditioning knob and rims. It was displayed at the Miami Institute of Contemporary Art for 1 week. Chrome Hearts also worked with Snapchat's Lens Studio to display an augmented reality version of the Rolls-Royce. In May 2021, they worked together again to release a collection to promote Drake's album Certified Lover Boy. This collection was limited and was exclusively sold in Chrome Hearts' Miami store.

In June 2021, Chrome Hearts and Baccarat co-produced a decanter and tumbler set, featuring Chrome Hearts' Pyramid Plus design.

Boutiques

As of 2022, there are Chrome Hearts retail stores in:
USA: New York City, Los Angeles, Malibu, Las Vegas, Honolulu, Miami, Aspen
Asia: Tokyo, Osaka, Nagoya, Fukuoka, Kobe, Hong Kong, Taipei, Seoul, Busan, Beijing, Hangzhou, Chengdu
Europe: Paris, London, Manchester
Caribbean: St. Barth
Each Chrome Hearts store has been regarded as unique from one another as a result of the diversity of both interior design and exclusive products. Chrome Hearts is sold in luxury malls such as Bergdorf Goodman, Isetan, Prince's Building and Selfridges. In 2018 and 2021, the brand opened a pop-up store in New York for the Sex Records collection, which included products such as customised clothing and toy cars.

Awards and honours
In 1992, Chrome Hearts won the CFDA Accessories Designer of the Year award.

References

Companies established in 1988
Clothing brands of the United States
Silversmithing
Culture of Los Angeles
Fashion accessory brands
High fashion brands
Luxury brands